The Mexico national futsal team is controlled by the Mexican Football Federation, the governing body for futsal in Mexico and represents the country in international futsal competitions, such as the World Cup and the CONCACAF Championships.

Mexico has competed in the FIFA Futsal World Cup only once. Unlike 11-a-side games, futsal is not the strength of Mexico. The Mexicans now are struggling to emerge from the shadow of powerful regional rivals United States, Cuba, Guatemala, Costa Rica and recently is Panama. Despite making it to the semi-finals of the CONCACAF Futsal Championship on four occasions, the Mexicans have never done better than the third-place finish they managed at the tournament's debut edition back in 1996.

It was their fourth semi-final appearance at the 2012 CONCACAF Futsal Championship that Mexico booked their ticket to Thailand 2012 with some noteworthy performances against strong teams. Their campaign began with a valuable draw against Costa Rica and successive wins over St. Kitts and Nevis and Cuba were enough to see them through to the semi-final and guarantee them a place at their first ever FIFA Futsal World Cup, taking the second slot in their group after Costa Rica pipped them to first place on goal difference.

Competitive record

FIFA Futsal World Cup

CONCACAF Futsal Championship

Current squad

Total 
Until to 02/12/2018.

See also
 Mexico national football team record
 Mexico national football team schedule and results
 Mexico national under-17 football team
 Mexico national under-20 football team
 Mexico national under-23 football team
 Mexico national beach football team

References

External links
 

Mexico
Futsal
Futsal in Mexico